Reddigudem is a village in NTR district of the Indian state of Andhra Pradesh. It is located in Reddigudem mandal.

Demographics 

The total 
population constitute,  males,  females and 
 children, in the age group of 0–6 years. The average literacy rate stands at 
61.97% with  literates, significantly lower than the national average of 73.00%.

References 

Villages in NTR district
Mandal headquarters in NTR district